Digital geologic mapping is the process by which geological features are observed, analyzed, and recorded in the field and displayed in real-time on a computer or personal digital assistant (PDA). The primary function of this emerging technology is to produce spatially referenced geologic maps that can be utilized and updated while conducting field work.

Traditional geologic mapping
Geologic mapping is an interpretive process involving multiple types of information, from analytical data to personal observation, all synthesized and recorded by the geologist. Geologic observations have traditionally been recorded on paper, whether on standardized note cards, in a notebook, or on a map.

Mapping in the digital era
In the 21st century, computer technology and software are becoming portable and powerful enough to take on some of the more mundane tasks a geologist must perform in the field, such as precisely locating oneself with a GPS unit, displaying multiple images (maps, satellite images, aerial photography, etc.), plotting strike and dip symbols, and color-coding different physical characteristics of a lithology or contact type (e.g., unconformity) between rock strata. Additionally, computers can now perform some tasks that were difficult to accomplish in the field, for example, handwriting or voice recognition and annotating photographs on the spot.

Digital mapping has positive and negative effects on the mapping process; only an assessment of its impact on a geological mapping project as a whole shows whether it provides a net benefit. With the use of computers in the field, the recording of observations and basic data management changes dramatically. The use of digital mapping also affects when data analysis occurs in the mapping process, but does not greatly affect the process itself.

Advantages
 Data entered by a geologist may have fewer errors than data transcribed by a data entry clerk.
 Data entry by geologists in the field may take less total time than subsequent data entry in the office, potentially reducing the overall time needed to complete a project.
 The spatial extent of real world objects and their attributes can be entered directly into a database with geographic information system (GIS) capability. Features can be automatically color-coded and symbolized based on set criteria.
 Multiple maps and imagery (geophysical maps, satellite images, orthophotos, etc.) can easily be carried and displayed on-screen.
 Geologists may upload each other's data files for the next day's field work as reference.
 Data analysis may start immediately after returning from the field, since the database has already been populated.
 Data can be constrained by dictionaries and dropdown menus to ensure that data are recorded systematically and that mandatory data are not forgotten
 Labour-saving tools and functionality can be provided in the field e.g. structure contours on the fly, and 3D visualisation
 Systems can be wirelessly connected to other digital field equipment (such as digital cameras and sensor webs)

Disadvantages
 Computers and related items (extra batteries, stylus, cameras, etc.) must be carried in the field.
 Field data entry into the computer may take longer than physically writing on paper, possibly resulting in longer field programs.
 Data entered by multiple geologists may contain more inconsistencies than data entered by one person, making the database more difficult to query.
 Written descriptions convey to the reader detailed information through imagery that may not be communicated by the same data in parsed format.
 Geologists may be inclined to shorten text descriptions because they are difficult to enter (either by handwriting or voice recognition), resulting in loss of data.
 There are no original, hardcopy field maps or notes to archive. Paper is a more stable medium than digital format.

Educational and scientific uses

Some universities and secondary educators are integrating digital geologic mapping into class work. For example, The GeoPad project  describes the combination of technology, teaching field geology, and geologic mapping in programs such as Bowling Green State University’s geology field camp. 
At Urbino University (Italy) :it:Università di Urbino, Field Digital Mapping Techniques are integrated in Earth and Environmental Sciences courses since 2006  .
The MapTeach program is designed to provide hands-on digital mapping for middle and high school students. The SPLINT  project in the UK is using the BGS field mapping system as part of their teaching curriculum

Digital mapping technology can be applied to traditional geologic mapping, reconnaissance mapping, and surveying of geologic features. At international digital field data capture (DFDC) meetings, major geological surveys (e.g., British Geological Survey and Geological Survey of Canada) discuss how to harness and develop the technology. Many other geological surveys and private companies are also designing systems to conduct scientific and applied geological mapping of, for example, geothermal springs and mine sites.

Equipment
The initial cost of digital geologic computing and supporting equipment may be significant. In addition, equipment and software must be replaced occasionally due to damage, loss, and obsolescence. Products moving through the market are quickly discontinued as technology and consumer interests evolve. A product that works well for digital mapping may not be available for purchase the following year; however, testing multiple brands and generations of equipment and software is prohibitively expensive.

Common essential features
Some features of digital mapping equipment are common to both survey or reconnaissance mapping and “traditional” comprehensive mapping. The capture of less data-intensive reconnaissance mapping or survey data in the field can be accomplished by less robust databases and GIS programs, and hardware with a smaller screen size.

 Devices and software are intuitive to learn and easy to use
 Rugged, as typically defined by military standards (MIL-STD-810) and ingress protection ratings
 Waterproof
 Screen is easy to read in bright sunlight and on gray sky days
 Removable static memory cards can be used to back up data
 Memory on board is recoverable
 Real-time and post-processing differential correction for GPS locations
 Portable battery with at least 9 hours of life at near constant use
 Can change batteries in the field
 Batteries should have no “memory,” such as with NiCd
 Chargeable by unconventional power sources (generators, solar, etc.)
 Wireless real-time link to GPS or built-in GPS
 Wireless real-time link from computer to camera and other peripherals
 USB port(s)

Features essential to capture traditional geologic observations
Hardware and software only recently (in 2000) became available that can satisfy most of the criteria necessary for digitally capturing "traditional" mapping data.
 
 Screen about —compact but large enough to see map features. In 2009, some traditional mapping is conducted on PDAs.
 Lightweight—ideally less than 3 lbs.
 Transcription to digital text from handwriting and voice recognition.
 Can store paragraphs of data (text fields).
 Can store complex relational database with drop-down lists.
 Operating system and hardware are compatible with a robust GIS program.
 At least 512 MB memory.

Technology

History

Software
Since every geologic mapping project covers an area with unique lithologies and complexities, and every geologist has a unique style of mapping, no software is perfect for digital geologic mapping out of the box. The geologist can choose to either modify their mapping style to the available software, or modify the software to their mapping style, which may require extensive  programming. , available geologic mapping software requires some degree of customization for a given geologic mapping project. Some digital-mapping geologists/programmers have chosen to highly customize or extend ESRI's ArcGIS instead. At digital field data capture meetings such as at the British Geological Survey in 2002  some organisations agreed to share development experiences, and some software systems are now available to download for free.

References

External links
 Bowling Green State University digital geologic mapping
 Digital geologic mapping program at the Alaska Division of Geological & Geophysical Surveys (DGGS)
 Proceedings of Digital Mapping Techniques workshop
 The System for Integrated Geoscience Mapping (SIGMA)  within the Earth and Planetary Observation and Monitoring Team]  of the British Geological Survey
  - Digital Geologic Mapping at the University of Kansas Geology
 Geopad Project - Information Technology for Field Science Education and Research
Richardson Geological Consulting 
 GIS Mapping - GIS mapping information for mineral exploration

Geologic maps
Applications of geographic information systems

he:מפה גאולוגית#מפה דיגיטלית